Pierre Michelin is a name. People with that name include:

 Pierre Michelin (1903–1937), French businessman
 Pierre Michelin (born 1937), French footballer

Michelin, Pierre